Eduardo González Valiño, nicknamed Chacho (14 April 1911 – 21 October 1979) was a Spanish association footballer. Chacho was born and died in A Coruña. During his career he played for Atlético de Madrid (1934–1936) and Deportivo de La Coruña (1927–1934, 1936–1946).

He later coached Deportivo, and a statue erected in his name can be found by the Riazor stadium.

International career 
He managed to score 7 goals for the Spain national football team in only 3 caps, in part thanks to a 6-goal haul against Bulgaria on 21 May 1933, in a 13-0 win. His other international goal came in the Iberian Derby on 11 March 1934, scoring his side's first of an eventual 9-0 win. He also participated in the 1934 FIFA World Cup.

International goals 
Scores and results list Spain's goal tally first.

References

External links
Profile

1911 births
1979 deaths
Spanish footballers
Spain international footballers
1934 FIFA World Cup players
Atlético Madrid footballers
Deportivo de La Coruña players
Spanish football managers
Deportivo de La Coruña managers
Association football forwards